The 2015–16 Southeastern Louisiana Lady Lions basketball team represented Southeastern Louisiana University during the 2015–16 NCAA Division I women's basketball season. The Lady Lions, led by second year head coach Yolanda Moore, played their home games at the University Center. They were members of the Southland Conference. They finished the season 4–25, 3–15 in Southland play to finish in a tie for twelfth place. They failed to qualify for the Southland women's tournament.

Roster

Schedule
Source

|-
!colspan=9 style="background:#006643; color:#EAAB00;"| Non-conference regular season

|-
!colspan=9 style="background:#006643; color:#EAAB00;"| Southland Conference regular season

See also
2015–16 Southeastern Louisiana Lions basketball team

References

Southeastern Louisiana Lady Lions basketball seasons
Southeastern Louisiana
Southeastern Louisiana
Southeastern Louisiana